The Icelandic Evangelical Lutheran Church is an historic Lutheran church building at 415 Beaupre St. (also known as Adelaide St.) in Pembina City in Pembina County, North Dakota.  It was listed on the National Register of Historic Places in 2019.

It has an onion dome.  It was originally an Icelandic Evangelical Lutheran church.  In 1937 it became a Ukrainian Orthodox one, the Ukrainian Orthodox Church of St. John, and it was remodeled to include an onion dome.  The Fort Pembina Historical Society was working to get it listed on the National Register.

See also
Vikur Lutheran Church at Mountain, Mountain, North Dakota, also National Register-listed

References

External links

Churches on the National Register of Historic Places in North Dakota
Church of Iceland
Ukrainian Orthodox Church of the USA church buildings

Icelandic-American culture in North Dakota
National Register of Historic Places in Pembina County, North Dakota
Ukrainian-American culture in North Dakota
Lutheran churches in North Dakota